Thomas Morrison Ashe (13 July 1920 – 1997) was a Scottish footballer who played for Dumbarton.

References

1920 births
1997 deaths
Dumbarton F.C. players
Scottish Football League players
Scottish footballers
Association football inside forwards